Saint Francis Xavier College is a Roman Catholic sixth form college in South London, England. It is located on the borders of Wandsworth and Lambeth close to Clapham South tube station. It offers courses for 16- to 19-year-olds, as well as Adult Education classes. As of 2018 there are about 1,300 enrolled students, the vast majority studying at Level 3.

History
The college was established in 1985. It is named after Saint Francis Xavier. Graham Thompson is the current principal.

The college introduced the International Baccalaureate (IB) in September 2010. The IB Diploma is a qualification which was until recently, almost exclusively offered by independent schools in the UK.

References

External links
 Saint Francis Xavier College website

Education in the London Borough of Wandsworth
Sixth form colleges in London
Learning and Skills Beacons
E
Catholic Church in London
Catholic secondary schools in the Archdiocese of Southwark